Uelia is a genus of moths belonging to the subfamily Tortricinae of the family Tortricidae.

Species
 Uelia sepidapex Razowski, 1982

See also
List of Tortricidae genera

References

External links
tortricidae.com

Euliini
Tortricidae genera